Maze is a surname. Notable people with the surname include:

 Bill Maze (born 1946), American politician
 Bill Maze (tennis) (born 1956), American tennis player
 Daniel Maze, Belgian film director
 Irv Maze, American judge
 Michael Maze, Danish table tennis player
 Tina Maze, Slovenian skier